Mu'awiya ibn Hisham (() was an Arab general and prince, the son of the Umayyad Caliph Hisham ibn Abd al-Malik (r. 724–743), who distinguished himself in the Arab–Byzantine Wars. His son, Abd al-Rahman ibn Mu'awiya, was the founder of the Emirate of Córdoba and the Umayyad line of al-Andalus.

Origins 
Biographical details about Mu'awiya are sparse. His father was Caliph Hisham ibn Abd al-Malik.

Military career 
Mu'awiya is known chiefly for his role in the Arab–Byzantine Wars, where he led many invasions against Byzantine Asia Minor. The first campaign he led was in summer 725, which was carried out in conjunction with a naval attack by Maymun ibn Mihran against Cyprus. According to Arab accounts, Mua'wiya's army reached as far as Dorylaion, capturing many prisoners and sacking several forts. Mu'awiya is also recorded to have launched an expedition in 726, possibly in winter, but nothing specific is known of it. In 727, he led another expedition, alongside Abdallah al-Battal. Battal captured and razed Gangra first, and then their combined forces took the fortress of Ateous, and advanced on Nicaea. Despite a 40-day siege, however, they failed to capture it. In 728 he led the southern expedition into Asia Minor, while his brother Sa'id ibn Hisham led the northern; neither appears to have been particularly successful.

Muslim sources attribute to him the capture of the fortress of Charsianon in September/October 730, but Byzantine sources state that this was done by Mu'awiya's uncle, Maslama ibn Abd al-Malik. In the next year, his forces were reportedly unable to penetrate the frontier, while a secondary expedition by al-Battal was heavily defeated. In 732, Mu'awiya's expedition penetrated as far as Akroinon. In 733, he led an expedition into Paphlagonia. He continued to lead expeditions over the next few years, but although they ranged deep into Asia Minor in search of plunder—one of his raiding parties reportedly reached Sardeis near the Aegean coast—no major town or fortress appears to have been captured. In summer 737, he again led the southern expedition, but died, according to Theophanes the Confessor, by falling from his horse during a hunt.

Legacy 
He had thirteen sons, the most prominent being Abd al-Rahman (731–788), whose mother was a Berber , who escaped the fall of the Umayyad dynasty during the Abbasid Revolution in 750 to al-Andalus, where he founded the Umayyad Emirate of Córdoba. Mu'awiya was thus the ancestor of the emirs, and later caliphs, of al-Andalus until the dynasty's end in the 11th century.

Another son of Mu'awiya, Aban, led a revolt against the Abbasids in 751, but was defeated and died in captivity. Aban's son Ubayd Allah later joined Abd al-Rahman I in al-Andalus, as did Mu'awiya's other son, Abd Allah, and grandson, al-Mughira ibn al-Walid. Another son of Mu'awiya, Yahya, died while escaping Abbasid Syria with Abd al-Rahman I.

References

Sources 
 
 
 
 
 
 

737 deaths
Umayyad people of the Arab–Byzantine wars
Sons of Umayyad caliphs
Deaths by horse-riding accident
Generals of the Umayyad Caliphate
Arab generals
Year of birth unknown
8th-century Arabs